Richard Melo (born August 10, 1968) is an American author and book reviewer. He is the author of the novels Happy Talk and Jokerman 8.

Biography
Richard Melo was born in San Francisco, California and attended San Francisco State University. He currently lives in Portland, Oregon.

As a book critic since 2004, Melo has reviewed books by Thomas Pynchon, William Vollmann, Colson Whitehead, and Tom Robbins, among others. Melo is a member of the National Book Critics Circle and has written about Tom Wolfe for the NBCC blog.

His fiction has appeared in Willamette Week and Gobshite Quarterly. He began his career as a playwright with two productions appearing on the Mt. Hood Community College stage in the early 1990s. He is a graduate of the Creative Writing program at San Francisco State University.

Notes

External links
 Official Richard Melo web site

21st-century American novelists
American male novelists
1968 births
Living people
Writers from San Francisco
Writers from Portland, Oregon
San Francisco State University alumni
Environmental fiction writers
21st-century American male writers
Novelists from Oregon